To Hal and Bacharach is a 1998 tribute album featuring songs written by Hal David and Burt Bacharach covered by Australian artists. The idea, developed by Kurt Luthy, Christa Mitchell and Melissa Whebell, was to have a number of Australian performers cover various David/Bacharach tunes, among them: Regurgitator, Rebecca's Empire, the Whitlams, Tex Perkins, the Avalanches, Dave Graney and Frank Bennett

At the ARIA Music Awards of 1998 the soundtrack was nominated for Best Original Soundtrack, Cast or Show Album.

Bacharach has had his songs recorded by many artists. The track listing gives the original artist as well as the covering artist. It also includes timings

Track listing

References

1998 albums
Burt Bacharach tribute albums